Castel d'Ario is a comune (municipality) in the Province of Mantua in the Italian region Lombardy, located about  east of Milan and about  east of Mantua. It was the birthplace of race car driver Tazio Nuvolari.

Castel d'Ario borders the following municipalities: Bigarello, Roncoferraro, Sorgà, Villimpenta.

References

External links
 Official website